Greece competed at the 1976 Summer Olympics in Montreal, Quebec, Canada. 36 competitors, 34 men and 2 women, took part in 34 events in 8 sports. Greek athletes have competed in every Summer Olympic Games. Greece did not win any Olympic medals at the 1976 Olympic Games.

Athletics

Men's 100 meters
 Michail Kousis
 Heat — did not start (→ did not advance)

Men's 400m hurdles
 Stavros Tziortzis
 Heats — 50.42s
 Semi final — 50.30s: 10th (→ did not advance)
 George Parris
 Heats — 51.91s
 Semi final — did not finish (→ did not advance)

Men's long jump
 Pana Hatzistathis
 Qualification — 7.33m (→ did not advance)

Men's marathon
 Michail Kousis — 2:21:42 (→ 29th place)

Boxing

Cycling

One cyclist represented Greece in 1976.

Individual road race
 Mikhail Kountras — did not finish (→ no ranking)

Sprint
 Mikhail Kountras — 22nd place

1000m time trial
 Mikhail Kountras — 1:11.435 (→ 21st place)

Sailing

Shooting

Swimming

Weightlifting

Wrestling

References

External links
 Official Olympic Reports

Nations at the 1976 Summer Olympics
1976 Summer Olympics
Olympics